Francis Kimanzi (born 29 May 1976) is a Kenyan football coach who manages Wazito.

Playing career
Kimanzi played club football for Mathare United between 1994 and 2002, before becoming manager.

Coaching career
Kimanzi was appointed full-time manager of the Kenyan national side on 11 December 2008, having held the post as a caretaker since May 2008. He was sacked from the post of national team coach after the 2008 CECAFA Cup in January 2009 due to disputes between him and Kenyan football administrators. 
After a one-year spell coaching club side Sofapaka, he was reappointed as head coach of the Kenyan national team in November 2011. In June 2012 he was sacked as manager of Kenya alongside his entire coaching staff after Kenya failed to qualify for the 2013 African Nations Cup.

After coaching Tusker, he returned to  Mathare United as manager in 2015. In August 2019 he was linked with a return to the Kenya national team. He returned to the Kenyan national team as manager in August 2019. Kimanzi has publicly spoken out against foreign coaches in Africa. In October 2020, he was dismissed from coaching Kenya. In November 2020 he became manager of Wazito.

References

1976 births
Living people
Kenyan footballers
Kenyan football managers
Mathare United F.C. players
Kenya national football team managers
Association footballers not categorized by position